By My Standards  (foaled  March 22, 2016 ) is an American Thoroughbred racehorse and the winner of the 2019 Louisiana Derby and the 2020 Alysheba Stakes.

Career

2018: Two-year-old season
By My Standards's first race was on November 24, 2018, at Churchill Downs, where he came in second.

2019: Three-year-old season
He did not pick up his first win until four races into his career, when he won a Maiden Special Weight race on February 16 at Fair Grounds Race Course.

On March 23, 2019, he scored an upset win at the 2019 Louisiana Derby. He came in at 22:1 odds and rallied in the stretch against Spinoff. The upset win gained him entry into the 2019 Kentucky Derby.

On May 4, 2019, he competed in the 2019 Kentucky Derby. He was placed at 18:1 odds going into the race, coming a disappointing 11th place. This was his final race of the 2019 season as he had hoof wall separation.

2020: Four-year-old season
He returned on February 9, winning an Allowance Optional Claiming race at Fair Grounds.

On March 21, he won the Grade 2 New Orleans Handicap, defeating Warrior's Charge and Mr. Freeze.

He picked up another victory on May 2, winning the Grade 2 Oaklawn Handicap. He passed Warrior's Charge near the end of the race to win.

On June 27, he ran well but only came 2nd behind Tom's D'Etat in the Grade 2 Stephen Foster Stakes. W. Bret Calhoun, his trainer, said that Tom's d'Etat had surprised them with his performance and was not going to be beaten.

By My Standards returned on August 1 in the 2020 Whitney Stakes against  Code of Honor, Improbable, and Tom's d'Etat. The favorite Tom's d'Etat stumbled coming out of the starting gate, and Improbable won the race and By My Standards came second. 

He then won the 2020 Alysheba Stakes over McKinzie, Mr. Freeze, and Owendale. This was his third Grade 2 win of the year.

His next start is likely to be the 2020 Breeders' Cup Classic.

2021: Five-year-old season

Pedigree

References

2016 racehorse births